John Angus MacMillan (27 March 1889 – 12 August 1956) was a Liberal party member of the House of Commons of Canada. He was born in Nova Scotia and became a barrister.

MacMillan attended Dalhousie University. He became mayor of Wadena, Saskatchewan in 1917 and that same year was elected a Liberal member of the Legislative Assembly of Saskatchewan for the Wadena provincial riding. He served in that legislature until his defeat in the 1921 provincial election.

He was first elected to Parliament at the Mackenzie riding in a by-election on 23 October 1933, after two previous unsuccessful attempts there in 1925 and 1926. MacMillan was re-elected in 1935 and served a complete term in the 18th Canadian Parliament. In the 1945 election, MacMillan was defeated by Alexander Malcolm Nicholson of the Co-operative Commonwealth Federation. MacMillan died at a hospital in Wadena in 1956.

References

External links
 

1889 births
1956 deaths
Dalhousie University alumni
Mayors of places in Saskatchewan
Members of the House of Commons of Canada from Saskatchewan
Liberal Party of Canada MPs
Saskatchewan Liberal Party MLAs